Keliko or Kaliko is an ethnic group from South Sudan, bordering Democratic Republic of the Congo, and Uganda. Most members of this ethnic group are Christians.

They speak the Keliko language, which is a Nilo-Saharan language. The population of this group likely exceeds 10,000.

The Keliko people are found in Lujule west and Wudabi payams in Morobo County, Central Equatoria State (CES) and in Ombachi in Yei County, CES, South Sudan. Some are also in the DR Congo and Uganda. The KELIKO people has a motto that says Trú álõ bã 'orá which means together we can.

The Wycliffe Bible Translators, in the Fall of 2018, gave to the Keliko People a translation of the New Testament in their own language. There were 1000 translated New Testaments distributed.

The rivers in keliko land 

 Ejirima
 Kembe
 Adekede
 Chokoli
Kembe
Yei
Kawe

References

Joshua Project

Ethnic groups in South Sudan
Ethnic groups in the Democratic Republic of the Congo

In DRC, they are called kaliko umi, more especially from Laibo, Mado, awubha awuzi and so on. There is a slight pronousation between Kaliko people in South Sudan and the in DRC.